Handel is a surname of German origin. The word "Handel" means "trade" or "commerce" in German and as such has no plural form. The name (like the famous composer's and his father's) was originally rather spelled "Händel" (with umlaut) which as a plural noun means something like "affairs". "Händel" is also a southern German variant of "Händlein" which means "little hand". The surname was later, in English-speaking places, also used as a given name.

People surnamed Handel or Händel
Bill Handel (born 1951), founder of the Center for Surrogate Parenting and an AM radio personality
Georg Händel (1622–1697), barber-surgeon and father of the composer George Frideric Handel
George Frideric Handel (born Georg Friedrich Händel, 1685–1759), German/British Baroque composer
Karen Handel (born 1962), American politician
Steven Handel (born 1945), American restoration ecologist and Rutgers University professor
Thomas Händel (born 1953), German politician

People with the given name Handel
Handel Cossham (1824–1890), British colliery owner, lay preacher and Liberal politician
Handel Greville (1921-2014), Welsh international rugby union fly-half